Resocortol is a synthetic glucocorticoid corticosteroid which was never marketed.

References 

Diketones
Diols
Glucocorticoids
Pregnanes
Abandoned drugs